Mezoneuron enneaphyllum  is a tropical tree species originating in India, Indo-China and Malesia.

Distribution 

It is found in Bangladesh ; China ; Guangxi ; Yunnan ; India ; Arunachal Pradesh ; Tripura ; Indonesia ; Java ; Lesser Sunda Island ; Malaysia ; Myanmar ; Pakistan ; Sulawesi ; Thailand ; Vietnam

References

 http://www.efloras.org/florataxon.aspx?flora_id=2&taxon_id=200011975

External links
 http://www.legumes-online.net/ildis/aweb/td100/td_21133.htm
 http://www.ildis.org/LegumeWeb?genus=Mezoneuron&species=enneaphyllum
 

Caesalpinieae
Flora of tropical Asia